The Military Archives of Sweden is the part of the National Archives of Sweden that keeps archives related to agencies that answer to the Ministry of Defence. The Military Archives were established in 1805 and contain listings of military personnel, drawings and descriptions of military buildings and equipment, maps, private files of key persons in Swedish military history, and photographs. The archived materials date from the 16th century to the present.

Since 1995, the Military Archives form a part of the government agency National Archives of Sweden.

External links
The Military Archives of Sweden Official website.

1805 establishments in Sweden
Archives in Sweden
Military archives
Military history of Sweden